Labiobarbus sabanus is a species of ray-finned fish in the genus Labiobarbus endemic to the Kinabatangan and Segama river basins in Sabah.

References

sabanus
Taxa named by Robert F. Inger
Fish described in 1962